Lyle D. Goodhue (September 30, 1903 – September 18, 1981) was an internationally known inventor, research chemist and entomologist, with 105 U. S. and 25 foreign patents. He invented the “aerosol bomb” (also known as the “bug bomb”), which was credited with saving the lives of many thousands of soldiers during World War II by dispensing malaria mosquito-killing liquid insecticides as a mist from small containers. The Bug Bomb became especially important to the war effort after the Philippines fell in 1942, when it was reported that malaria had played a major part in the defeat of American and British forces. After the war, this invention gave birth to a new international billion-dollar aerosol industry. A broad variety of consumer products ranging from cleaners and paints to hair spray and food have since been packaged in aerosol containers. Goodhue's other patents involved insect, bird and animal repellents; herbicides; nematocides; insecticides and other pesticides.

Education and personal life

Goodhue was born on a farm in Malaka Township, Jasper County, Iowa, on September 30, 1903, to Thomas Warwick and Katherine Jane (Engle) Goodhue. Because of his poor eyesight, he was not allowed to enter first grade in Malaka's one-room school house until he was nine years old. After retiring, he acknowledged that he was legally blind,

Goodhue graduated from Newton, Iowa High School in 1924. He went on to earn a B.S. (chemistry) in 1928, an M.S. (plant chemistry) in 1929 and a Ph.D. (plant chemistry) in 1934 from Iowa State University, Ames, Iowa.

He married Helen Elizabeth Hamaker, daughter of Charles Haynes and Jenny Leuna (Davis)
Hamaker June 19, 1929, in Des Moines, Iowa. A daughter and a son were born in Ames, Iowa while Goodhue was studying for his Ph.D., another son when he lived in Moorestown, New Jersey, working at the USDA Japanese Beetle Laboratory there, and another daughter in Maryland during World War II after he transferred to the USDA complex at Beltsville, Maryland.

Goodhue died September 18, 1981, in Bartlesville, Oklahoma, and is buried beside his wife Helen, who died June 14, 1995, in Memorial Park Cemetery, Bartlesville, Oklahoma.

Career

The disposable spray can was largely undeveloped until Lyle Goodhue devised a practical version and filed for a patent in 1941 while working for the U.S. Department of Agriculture (USDA).

Goodhue's earliest aerosol propellant idea came to mind when he worked in 1929–1930 as a research chemist on lacquer formulations at the DuPont Chemical laboratories in Parlin, New Jersey. That aerosol spray concept was greatly expanded, written in his lab notebook, and witnessed by his boss, Dr. Frank L. Campbell, October 5, 1935, when both worked at the USDA's Agricultural Research Center in Beltsville, Maryland.

As a result of their research, which began January 1941 at USDA, Goodhue, of Berwyn, Maryland, and William N. Sullivan, of Washington, D.C., received a patent in 1943 for an aerosol "dispensing apparatus". This was the first commercially feasible application which allowed a fine spray to escape through a nozzle mounted on a small container. The design, assigned to the U. S. government, was the ancestor of many popular commercial spray products in wide use today. Using liquified gas as a propellant,
its one-pound portable cylinder enabled soldiers to defend themselves against tropical malaria-carrying insects by spraying non-toxic insecticides inside tents and troop planes during World War II. From 1942 through 1945, more than 40 million "aerosol bombs" were sent to the troops.

In 1945, Goodhue, often called the "Father of the Aerosol Industry", joined Airosol, Inc., in Neodesha, Kansas, as director of research. This company, which had been originally established to manufacture aerosol containers of insecticide for the military during World War II, became a leading packager of aerosol spray consumer products after the war.

In 1947, Goodhue joined Phillips Petroleum Company, Bartlesville, Oklahoma, as a senior research chemist and director of agricultural chemicals research. Of the 98 patents which he received at Phillips, he felt that his most important discovery was Avitrol® a treatment which controls and disperses bird infestations through behavioral responses. He retired from Phillips in 1968 as Avitrol technical manager.

Aerosol development

Goodhue wrote this account in 1969 of his ground-breaking 1941 aerosol experiment while working for the USDA in Maryland:

In a 1967 newspaper interview, Dr. Goodhue had previously revealed a few more dramatic details of his discovery. Wayne Mason, a reporter for the Tulsa World wrote “It was on Easter Sunday in 1941 when the great moment came in Goodhue’s life. He had just sprayed a few
dozen American roaches with the new aerosol. In his words, “In less than 10 minutes all were on their backs. No one else was in the building. I yelled at the top of my voice and danced around wildly. As soon as I could regain my composure, I drove home like a mad man and called Bill Sullivan and John Fales, and with great enthusiasm gave them the results of the first
test.”

Honors and awards

 He was also a member of the professional chemical fraternity of Alpha Chi Sigma, the American Chemical Society, and the Entomological Society of America. 
Goodhue received a number of citations from the U.S. Army and U. S. Navy during and after World War II. He authored over 100 technical papers and scientific articles.
 1938 Gold Medal, Eastern Branch of the American Association of Economic Entomologists, for his paper entitled the “Effect of Particle Size of Some Insecticides on Their Toxicity to the Codling of Moth Lava”
 1943 Speaker, New York Herald Tribune Forum, Waldorf-Astoria, New York, New York

 1945 John Scott Award, Philadelphia, Pennsylvania, for the invention of insecticidal aerosols

 1948 Alumni Merit Award, Iowa State Alumni Association, Iowa State University, Ames, Iowa

 1954 Achievement Award, Chemical Specialties Manufacturers Association (CSMA), for work during World War II in developing aerosol insecticides to combat disease-carrying pests
 1966 Lyle D. Goodhue Research Building, dedicated in honor of his contributions to the aerosol industry, Aerosol Techniques, Inc., Milford, Connecticut
 1970 Kenneth A. Spencer Award, American Chemical Society, Kansas City section, for outstanding achievement in agricultural and food chemistry
 1970 Erik Andreas Rotheim Gold Medal, for outstanding contributions to the development of the international aerosol industry, Oslo, Norway
 2016 Hall of Fame, Newton (Iowa) Community Schools, in recognition of exemplary dedication and accomplishments in science

References

1903 births
1981 deaths
People from Bartlesville, Oklahoma
People from Jasper County, Iowa
People from Beltsville, Maryland
People from Newton, Iowa
People from South River, New Jersey
20th-century American inventors